Unfriend can refer to:

 Defriend from an Internet relationship
 Remove from one's Friends list
 Friending and following, a feature on social media sites, predominantly Facebook
 Friend Request, 2016 German horror film titled Unfriend in Germany
 Unfriend (film), 2014 Philippine film
 Unfriended, 2014 American film
 Unfriended: Dark Web, 2018 American film, sequel to Unfriended